Padna is a village in the Municipality of Piran in the Littoral region of Slovenia. It was first mentioned in sources dating to 1186.

Name
Padna was attested in written sources in 1384 as uresus Padhenam Muglarii as well as Padena and Padina. These transcriptions indicate that the original name of the settlement was Padina, derived from the common noun *padina 'steep slope', reflecting the local geography.

Churches
The local church is dedicated to Saint Blaise. Another small church above the settlement is dedicated to Saint Sabbas.

Art gallery
There is an art gallery in the village with a permanent exhibition of works by the Slovene artist Božidar Jakac, who lived in the village for a while.

References

External links

Padna on Geopedia

Populated places in the Municipality of Piran